Mayday is a 2016 studio album by German electronic music artist Boys Noize. It features guest appearances from Benga, Remy Banks, Poliça, Hudson Mohawke, and Spank Rock.

In advance of his tour starting in August 2016, Boys Noize released another version of "Birthday" with Hudson Mohawke, Spank Rock, Danny Brown, and Pell. "Rock the Bells" was previously teased in 2014, as "RunX" with Baauer, however Baauer has remained uncredited.

Track listing

Charts

References

External links
 

2016 albums
Boys Noize albums